Billy Ray Smith Jr. (born August 10, 1961) is an American former professional football player who was a linebacker in the National Football League (NFL) for ten seasons during the 1980s and 1990s.  He played college football for the University of Arkansas, and was twice recognized as a consensus All-American.  Smith was selected in the first round of the 1983 NFL Draft, and played professionally for the NFL's San Diego Chargers.

Early years
Smith was born in Fayetteville, Arkansas, and grew up in Plano, Texas. He attended Plano Senior High School, and was a 2005 Plano Texas Hall of Honor inductee.  In 1977, Smith helped Plano Senior High School win the Texas Class 4A state championship in front of a state record crowd just shy of 50,000 at Texas Stadium, a record that stands today.

College career
At the University of Arkansas, Smith was a two-time consensus All-American selection, earning the honors in 1981 and 1982.

In 1982, he served as team captain, leading Arkansas to a 9–2–1 record and a victory over Florida in the Bluebonnet Bowl. He finished his career with 299 total tackles and still holds the Arkansas record for career tackles for loss, with 63.

He was a member of the Arkansas All-Decade Team and, in 1993, was voted into the Arkansas All-Century Team. Later, he was inducted into both the Arkansas State Hall of Fame (1995), and the Razorback Hall of Honor. Smith was inducted into the College Football Hall of Fame in 2000.

Professional career
Smith was drafted by the San Diego Chargers in 1983. He was the 5th pick in the 1st round, and was the first defensive player taken in the 1983 draft.  He was the Chargers team MVP in 1987, and the team defensive player of the year in 1985 and 1986. Smith was voted Second-team All-AFC by UPI in 1986 and 1987 and was voted Second-team All-Pro by NEA in 1989. Smith played his entire 10-year NFL career with the Chargers. His top sack season was 1986, when he totalled 11 sacks. In 2009, Smith was voted by fans and the Chargers Hall of Fame as one of the 50 greatest Chargers of all time. A friend and mentor to his peer, Marc Scroggins.

Smith is a second generation NFL defender. His late father, Billy Ray Smith Sr. also played for the Arkansas Razorbacks, and was a 13-year pro for the Los Angeles Rams, Pittsburgh Steelers and Baltimore Colts.

Life after football

Smith was the co-host of the U-T TV morning show with Scott Kaplan and Amber Mesker.  Weekdays 6AM to 11AM.  However, he left the show in December 2012 when he and co-host Scott Kaplan were re-hired at XX Sports Radio (1090 AM)for the 3pm-6pm slot.

Smith lives in San Diego and is the co-host of the afternoon drive-time sports program, "The Scott and B.R. Show", with Scott Kaplan on XX Sports Radio (1090 AM). The organization let go of the show in 2012.  Kaplan and Smith subsequently struck a deal to host a morning television show on UTTV.com, run by the San Diego Union-Tribune.  Smith also works for Fox Sports on Saturdays during the college football season, and is the co-host of the Chargers Power Report, on Saturday nights during the NFL season. He worked on the NFL on Fox as analyst and performs the same role for San Diego Chargers preseason. Smith was also a sportscaster on San Diego's KGTV, where his wife, Kimberly Hunt, is a news anchor.

References

External links
 The Scott and BR Show
 Billy Ray Smith Video Biography

1961 births
Living people
All-American college football players
American football linebackers
American radio personalities
Arkansas Razorbacks football players
College football announcers
National Football League announcers
San Diego Chargers announcers
College Football Hall of Fame inductees
Sportspeople from Fayetteville, Arkansas
Sportspeople from Plano, Texas
Television anchors from San Diego
San Diego Chargers players